Fernando Pinto Coelho Bello (1 September 1924 – 8 November 1995) was a Portuguese sailor. Together with his brother Duarte Manuel Bello he competed at the 1948, 1952, 1956 and 1960 Olympics and won a silver medal in the Swallow class in 1948, placing fourth in 1952.

Bello brothers also raced Star class keelboats, winning a silver medal at the 1962 World Championship and a bronze in 1952.

References

1924 births
1995 deaths
Mozambican sportspeople
Portuguese male sailors (sport)
Sailors at the 1948 Summer Olympics – Swallow
Sailors at the 1952 Summer Olympics – 5.5 Metre
Sailors at the 1960 Summer Olympics – 5.5 Metre
Olympic sailors of Portugal
Olympic silver medalists for Portugal
Olympic medalists in sailing
Medalists at the 1948 Summer Olympics